"2 Phút Hơn" (or "Hai Phút Hơn"; translates as "Over Two Minutes") is a 2020 Vinahouse (Vietnamese House) song by Pháo. Several remixes of the song were made. One by DJ/producer KAIZ was released on November 28, 2020 and gained global popularity, one of a number of Vietnamese songs to become popular on TikTok.

The KAIZ remix reached the top 10 on Spotify's Global Viral chart, and became the world's most shazamed track on Shazam in December 2020.

Internet meme
The character Zero Two from the Japanese anime television series Darling in the Franxx had become a popular subject for internet memes. A video posted in 2018 depicted Zero Two doing a popular hip-swaying dance associated with the 2014 song "ME!ME!ME!" by TeddyLoid. In November 2020, an anime music video of the Zero Two dancing clip put to the KAIZ remix version of "Hai Phút Hơn" went viral, leading to an internet meme. The video also intercut Zero Two dancing with the character of Marija the Violinist from the mobile rhythm game Muse Dash, who is seated on a black car and tapping out the beat.

A trend, starting in China, then saw users on Douyin mimicking the dance in real life. The Douyin user Cciinnn first used the song in a video. The dance then crossed over to Douyin's international version TikTok, with videos by Sava Schultz and by Lauren Burch becoming particularly popular. The dance has been performed by several K-pop idols, such as Aespa.

Other remixes
In 2021, Pháo and KAIZ released a subsequent remix of the song under the name "2 Phút Hơn (Make It Hot)" with the US rapper Tyga.

See also 
 List of Internet phenomena
 Caramelldansen
 Loituma Girl
 Nyan Cat

References

2020 songs
Vietnamese songs
Internet memes introduced in 2020
2020s fads and trends
Novelty and fad dances